Comins may refer to:

People
 Harry M. Comins (1882–1962), American politician, Mayor of Flint, Michigan (1938–1940)
 Linus B. Comins (1817-1892), American politician from Massachusetts
 Richard Blundell Comins (1848–1919), English Anglican priest
 William Comins (1901–1965), American Olympic long jumper

Places
 Comins Township, Michigan
 Comins, Michigan, an unincorporated community
 Comins Coch, Ceredigion, Wales

See also 
 Commins (disambiguation)
 Comyns (disambiguation)